10-Pin Bowling is a bowling video game developed by Morning Star Multimedia and published by Majesco Sales for the Game Boy Color.  10-Pin Bowling is one of few Game Boy Color games to support rumble, which is achieved by utilizing a rumble pak built directly into the cartridge.

Reception

Craig Harris, writing for IGN, described the game as "entirely basic and stripped down" and opined that it was "as basic as you can get on the Game Boy."

References

External links
 

1999 video games
Bowling video games
Game Boy Color games
Game Boy Color-only games
Majesco Entertainment games
Morning Star Multimedia games
North America-exclusive video games
Video games developed in the United States